Orlando Tilestone Daniels (March 20, 1860 – May 21, 1927) was a lawyer and political figure in Nova Scotia, Canada. He represented Annapolis County in the Nova Scotia House of Assembly as a Liberal from 1906 to 1925.

Early life 
He was born in Lawrencetown, Annapolis County, Nova Scotia, the son of Wellington Daniels, a farmer, and Lavinia Margeson. He was educated in Lawrencetown and at Acadia University. Daniels went on to study law with James Wilberforce Longley in Halifax, was called to the Nova Scotia bar in 1885 and set up practice in Bridgetown. In 1893, he married Mary Muir. Daniels was Attorney General in the province's Executive Council from 1911 to 1922. He died in Bridgetown.

References 
 Marble, AE Nova Scotians at home and abroad: biographical sketches ... (1977) p. 129 
 Charlesworth, HW A cyclopædia of Canadian biography : brief biographies of persons ... (1919) p. 206

External links
 

1860 births
1927 deaths
Nova Scotia Liberal Party MLAs